The National Center for Sports Safety (NCSS) is a non-profit organization dedicated to promoting the importance of injury prevention and safety in youth sports. It was founded in 2001 by Lawrence J. Lemak, M.D. It focuses on decreasing the number and/or severity of injuries by educating trainers, coaches and the general public on sports safety, and by collecting, analyzing and researching injury data.

In 2004, the NCSS in conjunction with the National Athletic Trainers' Association (NATA), launched a comprehensive sports safety course called PREPARE. The course, which is available online, is targeted at volunteer coaches and parents. One of the goals of the course is to reduce the risk of brain-damage that occurs when a player that has suffered a concussion is sent back to the game too early, putting the athlete at risk for a second, more serious concussion. 

The NCSS serves as a source of sports safety information to many organizations including the United States Navy  and USA Baseball

See also
 Head injury criterion

References
 Jane E. Brody, Winning Is Good, but Playing Safely Is Better, New York Times, October 19, 2004

 https://web.archive.org/web/20080304124611/http://www.safetycenter.navy.mil/toolbox/sports/outdoor/default.htm
 http://www.mlb.com/usa_baseball/article.jsp?story=medsafety17
 http://www.sportssafety.org
 Fred Bowen, What You Don't Know Might Hurt You, The Washington Post, Friday, March 7, 2008; Page C12

 Kelly McClurg, HealthSouth's Lemak heads sports safety push, Birmingham Business Journal, 21 December 2001

 New online safety course for coaches launched by National Center for Sports Safety and the National Athletic Trainers' Association, The    Journal of Physical Education, Recreation &        Dance,  August, 2004

Non-profit organizations based in the United States